Herbaspirillum is a genus of bacteria, including the nitrogen-fixing Herbaspirillum lusitanum.

Although usually found in soil environments, it has also been identified as a contaminant of DNA extraction kit reagents, which may lead to its erroneous appearance in microbiota or metagenomic datasets.

References

Burkholderiales
Bacteria genera